Viktor Nikolaevich Borshch (born 9 September 1948) is a Russian former volleyball player who competed for the Soviet Union in the 1972 Summer Olympics.

In 1972 he was part of the Soviet team which won the bronze medal in the Olympic tournament. He played six matches.

External links
 
 

1948 births
Living people
Soviet men's volleyball players
Olympic volleyball players of the Soviet Union
Volleyball players at the 1972 Summer Olympics
Olympic bronze medalists for the Soviet Union
Olympic medalists in volleyball
Russian men's volleyball players
Medalists at the 1972 Summer Olympics